Four Play is an album by saxophonist Clifford Jordan with bassist Richard Davis, pianist James Williams and drummer Ronnie Burrage which was recorded in Tokyo in 1990 and released on the Japanese DIW label.

Reception

The AllMusic review by Scott Yanow stated, "Although this CD is technically listed under all four musicians' names, Jordan is primarily the lead voice. His sound was always instantly recognizable and he seemed to be in a good mood for the date, judging by the many song quotes he throws into his solos" calling it "a good example of the hard bop mainstream of the early 1990s as played by some of its best ".

Track listing

Personnel
Clifford Jordan – tenor saxophone
James Williams – piano
Richard Davis – bass
Ronnie Burrage – drums

References

1990 albums
Clifford Jordan albums
Richard Davis (bassist) albums
DIW Records albums